"Do It Like You Mean It" is a song by Swedish singer Frans featuring Yoel905. It was released as a digital download in Sweden on 24 May 2019 through Cardiac Records. The song was written by Dani Klein, Fredrik Andersson, Dirk Schoufs, Una Balfe, Michael Saxell, Frans Jeppsson Wall and Yoel905. The song did not enter the Swedish Singles Chart, but peaked at number seven on the Swedish Heatseeker Chart.

Music video
A music video to accompany the release of "Do It Like You Mean It" was first released onto YouTube on 10 July 2019 at a total length of two minutes and forty-eight seconds.

Track listing

Charts

Release date

References

2019 songs
2019 singles
Frans Jeppsson-Wall songs